Isidore Konti (July 9, 1862 – January 11, 1938) was a Vienna-born (of Hungarian parents) sculptor.  He began formal art studies at the age of 16 when he entered the Imperial Academy in Vienna, where he studied under Edmund von Hellmer. In 1886, he won a scholarship that allowed him to study in Rome for two years. While there he developed a love of Renaissance art that was to affect the nature of his mature sculpture. Upon returning to Austria, Konti worked as an architectural modeler.

In 1890, 1891 or 1892 (depending on the source) Konti moved, permanently as it turned out, to America, there going straight to Chicago, where he began working on sculptural decorations for the 1893 World's Columbian Exposition.  When the work there was completed, he moved to New York City and commenced working as an assistant for fellow Austrian expatriate Karl Bitter.  Konti's skills as a modeler kept him in much demand—for the 1900 Pan-American Exposition in Buffalo, New York; for the 1904 Louisiana Purchase Exposition in St. Louis; and for the 1915 Panama Pacific Exposition in San Francisco. In 1906 he was elected into the National Academy of Design as an Associate member and became a full Academician in 1909.

Konti died in Yonkers, New York on January 11, 1938.

Architectural sculpture
Like many sculptor of that epoch Konti created architectural sculpture. His works in this arena include:

 Tympanum, Grace Chapel, New York City, 1894.
 Spandrel figures, the Elbridge Gerry Mansion, New York City,  1895.
 Three Graces (for which Audrey Munson served as the model) Hotel Astor, New York City, 1907.
 Frieze:  “A Festival Procession of the Arts,” Gainsborough Studios, 222 Central Park South, New York City,  1908.
 Statues of Justinian and Alfred the Great, Cuyahoga County Courthouse, Cleveland, Ohio, 1910. 
Twelve statues: Herbert Adams, Daniel Chester French, and Herman Matzen each modeled two of the others. Karl Bitter modeled four of them.
 Capitals, panels and allegorical figures for the Pan-American Building, Washington D.C. 1910.

Public monuments and fountains
 McKinley Memorial, Yonkers, New York  1906
 Mother and Child: the Bath, fountain in Katonah, New York,  c. 1910
 Recumbent figure of Morgan Dix, Trinity Church, New York,  1915
 The Meeting of Air and Water, Gumbel Memorial Fountain, Audubon Park, New Orleans, Louisiana,  1919.
 A bequest from Sarah Lavinia Hyams funded two identical fountains, with sculpture groups and wading pools:
 Hyams Memorial Fountain, Audubon Park, New Orleans, Louisiana,  1921.
 Hyams Memorial Fountain, City Park, New Orleans, Louisiana,  1921.
 Sarcophagus for Bishop Horatio Potter, Cathedral of St. John the Divine, New York City,  1921.
 Yonkers World War I Memorial, Yonkers, NY, 1922.
 Edgar John Lownes Memorial, Swan Point Cemetery, Rhode Island,  1924
 Hudson - Fulton Monument, Yonkers, New York,  1924
 Spanish - American War Memorial, Yonkers, New York,  1928
 Lincoln Monument, Lincoln Park, Yonkers, New York,  1929
 Father Kelehan Memorial, St. Joseph's Cemetery, Yonkers, New York,  1929
 Governor Francis T. Nicholls, State Capitol Building, Baton Rouge, Louisiana  1931
Besides these works Isidore Konti produced numerous medals, plaques, figures and figurines that are today highly sought after by museums and collectors.

Notes

References

 Craven, Wayne, Sculpture in America, Thomas Y. Crowell Co, NY, NY 1968
 Kvaran, Einar Einarsson, Architectural Sculpture in America unpublished manuscript
 Madigan, Mary Jean Smith, The Sculpture of Isidore Konti: 1862 - 1938, The Hudson River Museum, Yonkers, NY 1974
 National Sculpture Society, Exhibition of American Sculpture Catalogue, 1923, National Sculpture Society, New York 1923
 Opitz, Glenn B, Editor, Mantle Fielding’s Dictionary of American Painters, Sculptors & Engravers, Apollo Book, Poughkeepsie NY, 1986
 Proske, Beatrice Gilman, Brookgreen Gardens Sculpture,  Brookgreen Gardens, South Carolina, 1968
 Taft, Lorado, The History of American Sculpture, MacMillan Co., New York,  NY 1925

1862 births
1938 deaths
20th-century American sculptors
19th-century American sculptors
19th-century American male artists
American male sculptors
National Sculpture Society members
20th-century American male artists